Cilioplea is a genus of fungi in the family Lophiostomataceae. The genus, circumscribed by Anders Munk in 1953, contains nine widespread species.

References

Lophiostomataceae
Dothideomycetes genera
Taxa named by Anders Munk
Taxa described in 1953